Daniel Lønne Iversen (born 19 July 1997) is a Danish professional footballer who plays as a goalkeeper for English club Leicester City.

Club career
Iversen started out in the academy at Gørding LIF, after which he joined the biggest club in the region, Esbjerg as a 12-year-old. He moved to English club Leicester City in January 2016, signing a contract until June 2019.

Iversen moved on loan to EFL League Two side Oldham Athletic in July 2018, the same day as he signed a new four-year contract with Leicester. He made his professional debut on the first day of the 2018–19 season, starting the game against Milton Keynes Dons. Iversen helped Oldham to an FA Cup "giant killing" against Premier League side Fulham, saving a late penalty in a 2–1 victory. Iversen would go on to make 49 appearances in all competitions for The Latics.

In July 2019, Iversen moved to EFL League One team Rotherham United on a season long loan. Iversen made his Rotherham debut on 3 August 2019, in a 2–1 victory over AFC Wimbledon.

In August 2020, Iversen joined Belgian First Division A team Oud-Heverlee Leuven on a season-long loan. Iversen started five games before suffering a hip injury in the match against Oostende. Following his return from injury, he became second choice goalkeeper behind Rafael Romo, which resulted in his loan being terminated on 7 January 2021, allowing him to move on loan to English club Preston North End that same day. He returned to Preston North End for a second loan spell in August 2021. He was named as the Lancashire side's Player of the Year for 2021–22.

Iversen made his debut for Leicester (after six years with the club) on 23 August 2022 in an EFL Cup match away at Stockport County; he saved three penalties in the penalty shoot-out and was described as a "hero". His performance was praised by Leicester manager Brendan Rodgers. He made his Premier League debut in a 1–1 draw against Brentford on 18 March 2023.

International career
Iversen has represented Denmark at youth international levels from under-16 to under-21. Iversen was called up to the under-21 squad for the 2019 UEFA European Under-21 Championship, playing in all three of Denmark's games and saving a penalty in a 3–1 victory against Austria. In September 2019, Iversen received his first call up to the senior Denmark team for the UEFA Euro 2020 qualifying matches against Gibraltar and Georgia.

Career statistics

Honours
Individual

 Preston North End Player of the Year: 2021–22

References

1997 births
Living people
Danish men's footballers
Denmark youth international footballers
Denmark under-21 international footballers
Esbjerg fB players
Leicester City F.C. players
Oldham Athletic A.F.C. players
Rotherham United F.C. players
Oud-Heverlee Leuven players
Preston North End F.C. players
English Football League players
Belgian Pro League players
Association football goalkeepers
Danish expatriate men's footballers
Danish expatriate sportspeople in England
Expatriate footballers in England
Danish expatriate sportspeople in Belgium
Expatriate footballers in Belgium
People from Esbjerg Municipality
Sportspeople from the Region of Southern Denmark
Premier League players